The Practical Shooting Association of Panama, Spanish Club de Tiro Práctico de Panamá, is the Panamanian association for practical shooting under the International Practical Shooting Confederation.

References 

Regions of the International Practical Shooting Confederation
Sports organizations of Panama